Just Add Water is a 2008 American romantic comedy film written and directed by Hart Bochner. The film stars Dylan Walsh as a hardworking man living in the same small town in which he grew up, Danny DeVito as a gas station owner, and Justin Long as a meth dealer.

Plot 
This film is an offbeat romantic comedy about Ray Tuckby, a decent guy with a dead-end life in the dead-end town of Trona, California. After discovering that his wife has had an affair with his brother Mark and that his son Eddie is actually Mark's son, he decides to start his life all over again.

Ray's mother and sister die after they fight over his mother's secret lemon meringue pie recipe. After their funeral, his mother's lawyer gives Ray his share of his mother's legacy, including the recipe. He gives the legacy to Eddie for his college expenses, but Eddie says he is working for the local teenage meth baron, Dirk.

After Ray meets and takes encouragement from Merl, a new Chevron gas station operator, Ray begins to dream again.

Ray musters the nerve to pursue his childhood love, Nora, and after Dirk shuts down the town's electricity and water supplies, Ray and his neighbors finally plot a plan to take back his community by toppling Dirk.

Ray then goes on to marry Nora and opens a restaurant with her, using his mother's lemon meringue pie as the signature dish. Eddie works as his chef while Spoonie, Denny and his wife work as waiters. Nora is also shown to be expecting a baby.

Cast
Dylan Walsh as Ray Tuckby
Tracy Middendorf as Nora
Danny DeVito as Merl Stryker
Penny Balfour as Charlene
Will Rothhaar as Dirk
Justin Long as Spoonie
Melissa McCarthy as Selma
Anika Noni Rose as R'ch'lle
Jonah Hill as Eddie Tuckby
June Squibb as Mother
Brad Hunt as Denny
Lindsey Axelsson as Chrisy
Chelsea Field as Jeanne
Cerina Vincent as The Mrs.
Tracey Walter as Clem
Jenifer Boisvert as Nurse

External links

2008 films
2008 romantic comedy films
American romantic comedy films
Films directed by Hart Bochner
Films scored by John Swihart
Films set in California
2000s English-language films
2000s American films